is a 1928 black and white Japanese silent film with benshi accompaniment directed by Shozo Makino and Sadatsugu Matsuda. It is a posthumous work by Makino and is the last film starring his son, Masahiro Makino. in his first role in a comedy film.

References

External links
 

1928 films
Films directed by Sadatsugu Matsuda
Japanese silent films
Japanese black-and-white films

ja:雷電